Óscar Daza Flores (born 24 August 1983) is a Bolivian football manager.

Career
Born in Oruro, Daza acquired his coaching licenses in Mexico, and worked in the youth categories of several clubs in the country, including Club América. He was also an assistant manager at Potros UAEM.

In 2018, Daza returned to his home country after being named manager of Bolívar's youth setup. On 26 August 2021, he was appointed in charge of San José, but only lasted one match before being sacked on 14 September.

References

External links

1983 births
Living people
People from Oruro, Bolivia
Bolivian football managers
Bolivian Primera División managers
Club San José managers
Bolivian expatriate football managers
Bolivian expatriate sportspeople in Mexico
Expatriate football managers in Mexico